The Millionaire's Row Historic District is a national historic district located at Williamsport, Pennsylvania.  The district includes 263 contributing buildings and one contributing site in a residential area of Williamsport. The buildings date as early as 1855, and are representative of Victorian style architecture. Notable non-residential buildings include the Trinity Church and Parish House, First Church of Christ-Scientist, Weightman Block, Park Home, and the Covenant Central Presbyterian Church. Way's Garden is the contributing site and it was established in 1913.  Located in the district and separately listed is the Peter Herdic House.

The district was added to the National Register of Historic Places in 1985.

See also

National Register of Historic Places listings in Lycoming County, Pennsylvania

References

External links

Williamsport, Pennsylvania
Historic districts on the National Register of Historic Places in Pennsylvania
Historic districts in Lycoming County, Pennsylvania
National Register of Historic Places in Lycoming County, Pennsylvania